Behrouz Servatian (also romanized as “Behrūz Servatiān”, IPA: behˈɾuːz seɾvætiˈyɒːn) (1937–2012), was an Iranian literary scholar, professor, and authority on the great Iranian lyric poet, Nizami Ganjavi.

Biography 
Behrouz Servatian was born in Miandoab, a southern town in West Azerbaijan, northwest Iran. He lived in his home town until he was 24. Having the fifth grade degree in sciences, he served as a mathematics teacher. In 1960 he gained the sixth grade degree in sciences with an average grade of 19.91. In 1963 he sat for the nationwide university entrance exam and, gaining the first place both in Persian language and literature and philosophy at once, he chose the former.
With an average grade of 18.2 (of 20), Servatian became the top student at the University of Tabriz in 1966 and was awarded the first-class medal of the Ministry of Science, Research and Technology. Servatian then went back to Miandoab to do cultural services. 

In 1972 he did an MA in Persian language and literature from the University of Tabriz. In 1975 he received his doctorate in Persian language and literature from the University of Tehran and was employed there. In 1979 he retired at the University of Tabriz, and from 1986 to 2003 he taught at the Islamic Azad University in Karaj.
Servatian spent the last years of his life editing Hafez’ ghazals and working on Safi-Ali-Shah’s Commentary, while writing a number of other works too.

His first book in Persian entitled A Study of “Farr” in Ferdowsi’s Shahnameh was published in 1971 by the Foundation of Iranian History and Culture.
Most of Servatian’s studies are about the great Iranian lyric poet, Nizami Ganjavi.
Behrouz Servatian died of a heart attack on 29 July, 2012 in Gohardasht, Karaj, Alborz Province, Iran at the age of 75 and was buried two days later in Behesht-e Sakineh cemetery near Karaj.

Servatian had five children, one son (Arash) and four daughters (Laleh, Paria, Golnar, Yasaman). His third daughter, Golnar, is a cartoonist and book illustrator.

Research works 

Servatian wrote and edited more than 50 Persian books, among them the critical edition of Nizami Ganjavi's Khamsa (lit. "The Five Books", in 5 volumes) by him is one of the best editions of the work available to date. The five books are as follows: Makhzan al-Asrar, Khosrow and Shirin, Leyli and Majnun, Haft Peykar, Eskandarnameh and دس ت تاریک، دس ت روشن بازنمودي از داستا ننویسی غرب و س نت ایرانی-اسلامی (Persian).doi:10.22059/jor.2019.254728.1666

He also published a commentary of the Diwan of Hafez in 4 volumes, 4000 pages, in 2001 (2nd edition: 2008). Servatian translated the Azeri Turkish famous poem Heydar Babaya Salam by Mohammad-Hossein Shahriar into Persian.

See also 
 Nizami Ganjavi

References

External links 
 IBNA (1) Books of late Iranian expert, Behrouz Servatian, ready for publication
 IBNA (2) Books of late Iranian expert, Behrouz Servatian, ready for publication
 Libraries Australia Resources for Bihrūz  Sarvatīyān
 Tehran Times Persian literature scholar Behruz Servatian dies at 75
 Shop Ketab Behrouz Servatian
 Mehr News گزارش تصویری تشییع پیکر مرحوم دکتر بهروز ثروتیان
 Mehr News ثروتیان پژوهنده‌ای وارسته و بی‌ادعا بود
 Fars News ثروتیان در گفتگو با فارس: تصحیح احمد شاملو از دیوان حافظ ارزش علمی ندارد
 Fars News بهروز ثروتیان در گفتگوی تفصیلی با فارس: پایهٔ غزل حافظ، قرآن و ولایت/ روزگاری دانستن فارسی فخر خواهد بود
 ganjoor.net ترجمهٔ فارسی منظومهٔ حیدربابا توسط دکتر بهروز ثروتیان
 archive.org سخنرانی بهروز ثروتیان؛ دربارهٔ سعدی (بخش اول)
 archive.org سخنرانی بهروز ثروتیان؛ دربارهٔ سعدی (بخش دوم)
 archive.org سخنرانی بهروز ثروتیان؛ دربارهٔ سعدی (بخش سوم)
 archive.org سخنرانی بهروز ثروتیان؛ دربارهٔ شرح چهارجلدی حافظ
 farhang.gov.ir پیام تسلیت وزیر ارشاد به مناسبت درگذشت استاد دکتر بهروز ثروتیان
 IBNA گفتگویی با چند تن از پژوهشگران ادبی دربارهٔ جایگاه خدمات و پژوهش‌های ادبی مرحوم ثروتیان
 Noormags یادی از دکتر بهروز ثروتیان: کتاب ماه ادبیات، ش پیاپی ۱۷۹، سال پانزدهم، ش ۱۱، شهریور ۱۳۹۱، صص ۱۱۰ ـ ۱۱۲

Persian-language writers
Iranian literary scholars
Iranian literary critics
Iranian writers
People from Miandoab
University of Tabriz alumni
1937 births
2012 deaths
Translators from Azerbaijani
People related to Persian literature
Researchers of Persian literature
Faculty of Letters and Humanities of the University of Tehran alumni